Discography for American jazz saxophonist Ornette Coleman.

As bandleader

Studio albums 
 1958: Something Else!!!! (Contemporary, 1958)
 1959: Tomorrow Is the Question! (Contemporary, 1959)
 1959: The Shape of Jazz to Come (Atlantic, 1959)
 1959: Change of the Century (Atlantic, 1960)
 1961: This Is Our Music (Atlantic, 1961)
 1960: Free Jazz (Atlantic, 1961)
 1961: Ornette! (Atlantic, 1962)
 1961: Ornette on Tenor (Atlantic, 1962)
 1965: Chappaqua Suite (Columbia, 1966)
 1966: The Empty Foxhole (Blue Note, 1966)
 1968: New York Is Now! (Blue Note, 1968)
 1968: Love Call (Blue Note, 1971)
 1971: Science Fiction (Columbia, 1972)
 1972: Skies of America (Columbia, 1972)
 1973-75: Dancing in Your Head (A&M, 1977)
 1977: Soapsuds, Soapsuds (Artists House, 1977)
 1976: Body Meta (Artists House, 1978)
 1979: Of Human Feelings (Antilles, 1982)
 1985: Song X (Geffen, 1986)
 1987: In All Languages (Caravan of Dreams, 1987)
 1988: Virgin Beauty (Portrait, 1988)
 1992: Naked Lunch with Howard Shore, The London Philharmonic Orchestra (Milan, 1992) – soundtrack
 1995: Tone Dialing (Harmolodic/Verve, 1995)
 1996: Sound Museum: Hidden Man (Harmolodic/Verve, 1996)
 1996: Sound Museum: Three Women (Harmolodic/Verve, 1996)
 2009: New Vocabulary (System Dialing, 2014)

Live albums 
 Town Hall, 1962 (ESP Disk, 1965) – rec. 1962
 At the "Golden Circle", Vol. 1 & 2 (Blue Note, 1966) – rec. 1965
 An Evening with Ornette Coleman (Polydor International, 1967) – rec. 1965
 The Music of Ornette Coleman - Forms & Sounds (RCA Victor, 1967)
 Ornette at 12 (Impulse!, 1968)
 Friends and Neighbors: Live at Prince Street (Flying Dutchman, 1972) – rec. 1970
 Crisis (Impulse!, 1972) – rec. 1969
 Opening the Caravan of Dreams (Caravan of Dreams, 1985)
 Prime Design/Time Design (Caravan of Dreams, 1985)
 Jazzbühne Berlin '88 (Repertoire, 1990) – rec. 1988
 The Belgrade Concert (Jazz Door, 1995) – rec. 1971
 Colors: Live from Leipzig (Harmolodic/Verve, 1997) – rec. 1971
 Sound Grammar (Sound Grammar, 2006) – rec. 2005
 Live in Paris 1971 (Jazz Row, 2007) – rec. 1971

Compilations 
 The Art of the Improvisers (Atlantic, 1970) – rec.1959-61
 Twins (Atlantic, 1971) – rec.1961
 To Whom Who Keeps a Record (Atlantic, 1975) – rec.1959-60
 Who's Crazy Vol. 1 & 2 (Atmosphere, 1979) – rec.1965
 Broken Shadows (Columbia, 1982) – rec.1971
 Beauty Is a Rare Thing (Rhino/Atlantic, 1995) 
 The Complete Science Fiction Sessions (Columbia, 2000)
 The Ornette Coleman Legacy (Atlantic, 2018) – rec.1960-61

As sideman 
With Paul Bley
 1958: Live at the Hilcrest Club 1958 (Inner City, 1976)
 1958: Coleman Classics Volume 1 (Improvising Artists, 1977)

With Charlie Haden
 1976: Closeness (Horizon, 1976)
 1976: The Golden Number (A&M, 1977)

With Jamaaladeen Tacuma
 1983–84: Renaissance Man (Gramavision, 1984)
 2010: For the Love of Ornette (Jazzwerkstatt, 2010)

With others
 Geri Allen, Eyes in the Back of Your Head (Blue Note, 1997)
 Louis Armstrong, Louis Armstrong and His Friends (Flying Dutchman/Amsterdam, 1970)
 Joe Henry, Scar (Mammoth, 2001)
 Jackie McLean, New and Old Gospel (Blue Note, 1968) – rec. 1967
 Yoko Ono, Yoko Ono/Plastic Ono Band on the track "AOS" (Apple, 1970)
 Lou Reed, The Raven (RCA, 2003)
 Gunther Schuller, Jazz Abstractions (Atlantic, 1960)
 Bob Thiele, Head Start (Flying Dutchman, 1967)
 James Blood Ulmer, Tales of Captain Black (Artists House, 1978)
 Sonny Rollins, Road Shows, Vol. 2 (Doxy, 2011)

References

Jazz discographies
Discographies of American artists